Altitude or height is a distance measurement, usually in the vertical or "up" direction, between a reference datum and a point or object. The exact definition and reference datum varies according to the context (e.g., aviation, geometry, geographical survey, sport, or atmospheric pressure). Although the term altitude is commonly used to mean the height above sea level of a location, in geography the term elevation is often preferred for this usage.

Vertical distance measurements in the "down" direction are commonly referred to as depth.

In aviation

In aviation, the term altitude can have several meanings, and is always qualified by explicitly adding a modifier (e.g. "true altitude"), or implicitly through the context of the communication. Parties exchanging altitude information must be clear which definition is being used.

Aviation altitude is measured using either mean sea level (MSL) or local ground level (above ground level, or AGL) as the reference datum.

So when the altimeter reads the country-specific flight level on the standard pressure setting the aircraft is said to be at "Flight level XXX/100" (where XXX is the transition altitude). When flying at a flight level, the altimeter is always set to standard pressure (29.92 inHg or 1013.25 hPa).

On the flight deck, the definitive instrument for measuring altitude is the pressure altimeter, which is an aneroid barometer with a front face indicating distance (feet or metres) instead of atmospheric pressure.

There are several types of altitude in aviation:

 Indicated altitude is the reading on the altimeter when it is set to the local barometric pressure at mean sea level. In UK aviation radiotelephony usage, the vertical distance of a level, a point or an object considered as a point, measured from mean sea level; this is referred to over the radio as altitude.(see QNH)
 Absolute altitude is the vertical distance of the aircraft above the terrain over which it is flying. It can be measured using a radar altimeter (or "absolute altimeter"). Also referred to as "radar height" or feet/metres above ground level (AGL).
 True altitude is the actual elevation above mean sea level. It is indicated altitude corrected for non-standard temperature and pressure.
 Height is the vertical distance above a reference point, commonly the terrain elevation. In UK aviation radiotelephony usage, the vertical distance of a level, a point or an object considered as a point, measured from a specified datum; this is referred to over the radio as height, where the specified datum is the airfield elevation (see QFE)
 Pressure altitude is the elevation above a standard datum air-pressure plane (typically, 1013.25 millibars or 29.92" Hg). Pressure altitude is used to indicate "flight level" which is the standard for altitude reporting in the U.S. in Class A airspace (above roughly 18,000 feet). Pressure altitude and indicated altitude are the same when the altimeter setting is 29.92" Hg or 1013.25 millibars.
Density altitude is the altitude corrected for non-ISA International Standard Atmosphere atmospheric conditions. Aircraft performance depends on density altitude, which is affected by barometric pressure, humidity and temperature. On a very hot day, density altitude at an airport (especially one at a high elevation) may be so high as to preclude takeoff, particularly for helicopters or a heavily loaded aircraft.

These types of altitude can be explained more simply as various ways of measuring the altitude:
Indicated altitude – the altitude shown on the altimeter.
Absolute altitude – altitude in terms of the distance above the ground directly below
True altitude – altitude in terms of elevation above sea level
Height – vertical distance above a certain point
Pressure altitude – the air pressure in terms of altitude in the International Standard Atmosphere
Density altitude – the density of the air in terms of altitude in the International Standard Atmosphere in the air

In satellite orbits

In atmospheric studies

Atmospheric layers

The Earth's atmosphere is divided into several altitude regions. These regions start and finish at varying heights depending on season and distance from the poles.  The altitudes stated below are averages:
 Stratosphere: Troposphere to 
 Mesosphere: Stratosphere to 
 Thermosphere: Mesosphere to 
 Exosphere: Thermosphere to 

The thermosphere and exosphere (along with the higher parts of the mesosphere) are regions of the atmosphere that are conventionally defined as space.

High altitude and low pressure

Regions on the Earth's surface (or in its atmosphere) that are high above mean sea level are referred to as high altitude.

At high altitude, atmospheric pressure is lower than that at sea level. This is due to two competing physical effects: gravity, which causes the air to be as close as possible to the ground; and the heat content of the air, which causes the molecules to bounce off each other and expand.

Temperature profile

The temperature profile of the atmosphere is a result of an interaction between radiation and convection. Sunlight in the visible spectrum hits the ground and heats it. The ground then heats the air at the surface.

However, when air is hot, it tends to expand, which lowers its density. Thus, hot air tends to rise and transfer heat upward. This is the process of convection. Convection comes to equilibrium when a parcel of air at a given altitude has the same density as its surroundings. Air is a poor conductor of heat, so a parcel of air will rise and fall without exchanging heat. This is known as an adiabatic process, which has a characteristic pressure-temperature curve. As the pressure gets lower, the temperature decreases.

Note that the presence of water in the atmosphere complicates the process of convection. Water vapor contains latent heat of vaporization. As air rises and cools, it eventually becomes saturated and cannot hold its quantity of water vapor.
As an average, the International Civil Aviation Organization (ICAO) defines an international standard atmosphere (ISA) with a temperature lapse rate of 6.49 °C per kilometer (3.56 °F per 1,000 feet). The actual lapse rate can vary by altitude and by location.

Effects on organisms

Humans

Medicine recognizes that altitudes above  start to affect humans, and there is no record of humans living at extreme altitudes above  for more than two years. As the altitude increases, atmospheric pressure decreases, which affects humans by reducing the partial pressure of oxygen. The lack of oxygen above  can cause serious illnesses such as altitude sickness, high altitude pulmonary edema, and high altitude cerebral edema. The higher the altitude, the more likely are serious effects. The human body can adapt to high altitude by breathing faster, having a higher heart rate, and adjusting its blood chemistry. It can take days or weeks to adapt to high altitude. However, above , (in the "death zone"), altitude acclimatization becomes impossible.

There is a significantly lower overall mortality rate for permanent residents at higher altitudes. Additionally, there is a dose response relationship between increasing elevation and decreasing obesity prevalence in the United States. In addition, the recent hypothesis suggests that high altitude could be protective against Alzheimer's disease via action of erythropoietin, a hormone released by kidney in response to hypoxia.
However, people living at higher elevations have a statistically significant higher rate of suicide. The cause for the increased suicide risk is unknown so far.

Athletes
For athletes, high altitude produces two contradictory effects on performance. For explosive events (sprints up to 400 metres, long jump, triple jump) the reduction in atmospheric pressure signifies less atmospheric resistance, which generally results in improved athletic performance. For endurance events (races of 5,000 metres or more) the predominant effect is the reduction in oxygen which generally reduces the athlete's performance at high altitude.

Athletes also can take advantage of altitude acclimatization to increase their performance. The same changes that help the body cope with high altitude increase performance back at sea level. These changes are the basis of altitude training which forms an integral part of the training of athletes in a number of endurance sports including track and field, distance running, triathlon, cycling and swimming.

Other organisms

Decreased oxygen availability and decreased temperature make life at high altitude challenging. Despite these environmental conditions, many species have been successfully adapted at high altitudes. Animals have developed physiological adaptations to enhance oxygen uptake and delivery to tissues which can be used to sustain metabolism. The strategies used by animals to adapt to high altitude depend on their morphology and phylogeny. For example, small mammals face the challenge of maintaining body heat in cold temperatures, due to their small volume to surface area ratio. As oxygen is used as a source of metabolic heat production, the hypobaric hypoxia at high altitudes is problematic.

There is also a general trend of smaller body sizes and lower species richness at high altitudes, likely due to lower oxygen partial pressures. These factors may decrease productivity in high altitude habitats, meaning there will be less energy available for consumption, growth, and activity.

However, some species, such as birds, thrive at high altitude. Birds thrive because of physiological features that are advantageous for high-altitude flight.

See also
 Atmosphere of Earth
 Coffin corner (aerodynamics) At higher altitudes, the air density is lower than at sea level. At a certain altitude it is very difficult to keep an airplane in stable flight.
 Geocentric altitude
 Near space

References

External links 
 
 
 Downloadable ETOPO2 Raw Data Database (2 minute grid)
 Downloadable ETOPO5 Raw Data Database (5 minute grid)
 Calculate true altitude with these JavaScript applications
 Find the altitude of any place
 How to Get Rid of Altitude Sickness

Aerospace
Physical geography
Topography
Vertical position